Neopostega falcata is a moth of the family Opostegidae. It is known only from a lowland rainforest in north-eastern Costa Rica.

The length of the forewings is about 2.1 mm. Adults are almost entirely white. Adults are on wing from March to April.

Etymology
The species name is derived from the Latin falcatus (sickle-shaped, curved) in reference to the diagnostic, large, curved cornutus in the male aedoeagus.

External links
A Revision of the New World Plant-Mining Moths of the Family Opostegidae (Lepidoptera: Nepticuloidea)

Opostegidae
Moths described in 2007